The Journal of Food Safety is a quarterly peer-reviewed scientific journal covering research on microbial food safety. It was established in 1977 and is currently published by Wiley-Blackwell. The journal moved to online-only publication in 2011. The editor-in-chief is Dr. Vivian C.H. Wu (USDA ARS).

References 

https://onlinelibrary.wiley.com/journal/17454565

External links 
 

Quarterly journals
Wiley-Blackwell academic journals
English-language journals
Food science journals
Publications established in 1977